Richard Eugene Lysander is an American former professional baseball pitcher. He had a four-season career in the majors, spread out over six years.

Career

Major League career
Oakland traded him to the Houston Astros after the 1981 season, but Lysander never played in the majors for Houston. The Astros traded him on to the Minnesota Twins for Bob Veselic the following off-season, and in  Rick was back in the majors. He remained with the Twins until , after which he was released, ending his major-league career.

Post-MLB life
Lysander didn't give up on pitching entirely, and eventually found a home in the Senior Professional Baseball Association. In  he pitched for the Bradenton Explorers, leading the league in saves with 11. In , he moved on to the Daytona Beach Explorers, pitching in eight games without allowing an earned run. This earned him a minor league contract with the Toronto Blue Jays, and he pitched in ten games for the Syracuse Chiefs that season before retiring.

External links

Pura Pelota

1953 births
Living people
American expatriate baseball players in Canada
Baseball players from California
Birmingham A's players
Bradenton Explorers players
Cardenales de Lara players
American expatriate baseball players in Venezuela
Chattanooga Lookouts players
Daytona Beach Explorers players
Jersey City A's players
Lewiston Broncs players
Major League Baseball pitchers
Minnesota Twins players
Modesto A's players
Oakland Athletics players
Ogden A's players
People from Huntington Park, California
San Jose Missions players
Syracuse Chiefs players
Tacoma Tigers players
Tigres de Aragua players
Toledo Mud Hens players
Tucson Toros players
Vancouver Canadians players